Bruno Mazza (3 June 1924 – 25 July 2012) was an Italian professional footballer who played as a midfielder.

Honours
Inter
 Serie A champion: 1952–53, 1953–54.

Fiorentina
 Serie A champion: 1955–56.

References

External links
 

1924 births
2012 deaths
Italian footballers
Italy international footballers
Serie A players
A.C. Milan players
U.S. Cremonese players
Como 1907 players
Genoa C.F.C. players
S.S.D. Lucchese 1905 players
A.C. Legnano players
Inter Milan players
ACF Fiorentina players
S.S.C. Bari players

Association football midfielders